The capital of Yemen is disputed between two cities:
Sana'a, the constitutional capital and seat of government for the Houthis
Aden, the temporary capital declared by President Hadi in 2015